The 2007–08 season is Levski Sofia's 86th season in the First League. This article shows player statistics and all matches (official and friendly) that the club has played during the 2007–08 season.

Transfers

Summer transfers

In: 

Out:

Winter transfers

In: 

Out:

Squad

Competitions

Supercup

A Group

Table

Results summary

Results by round

Fixtures and results

Bulgarian Cup

Second round

Levski advanced to Third round.

Third round

Levski advanced to Quarterfinals.

Quarterfinals

UEFA Champions League

Second qualifying round

External links 
 2007–08 Levski Sofia season

PFC Levski Sofia seasons
Levski Sofia